Madie may refer to:

Places
 Madie, Tennessee, USA

People
 a diminutive of the name Madison (name)
 a diminutive of the name Maddison
 a diminutive of the name Madeleine

Given named
 Madie Carroll, namesake of the Madie Carroll House
 Madie Ives, namesake of the Madie Ives Elementary School
 Madie Hall Xuma (1894–1982), U.S. African American educator and South African activist

See also

 Madi (disambiguation)
 Madhi (disambiguation)
 Mahdi (disambiguation)
 Maddi (disambiguation)

 Maddy (disambiguation) including Maddie
 Mady

 Madison (disambiguation)
 Madeleine (disambiguation)